"Our Time Now" is the third single from the Plain White T's from their album Every Second Counts. It was shipped to Pop Radio on November 6, 2007. It peaked at number 90 on the Billboard Hot 100 and number 29 on US Modern Rock charts.

The song was featured during a montage of people getting approved to go to Hollywood during American Idol on January 29, 2008. The promo caused the song to jump 20 spots on iTunes from 75 to 55 overnight.

"Our Time Now" was written by Tom Higgenson, Mia Post (Mia Koo), and Michael Daly and produced by Johnny K.

The band performed this on a show iCarly on the episode "iRue the Day."

Music video
The music video was inspired by the 1967 film The Graduate. It stars the band performing the song on a theater stage with a crew working around them. A family appears at the start of the second verse having an outdoor party with a pool. The ending shows Tom stopping a wedding and running off with the bride.

Charts

References

2007 singles
Plain White T's songs
Music videos directed by Shane Drake
Hollywood Records singles
2006 songs
Fearless Records singles
Songs written by Mike Daly
Song recordings produced by Johnny K